Ficus cordata, the Namaqua rock fig, or Namaqua fig is a species of fig that occurs in two disjunct populations in Africa, one in the arid southwest of the continent, and a second in the northern subtropics. In the south it is often the largest and most prominent tree, and is virtually restricted to cliff faces and rock outcrops, where it has a rock-splitting habit.

Subspecies
The subspecies are: 
 F. c. cordata – southwestern Africa
 F. c. lecardii (Warb.) C.C.Berg – Senegal to central Africa

Range and habitat
The nominate subspecies is native to arid western South Africa, Namibia and southwestern Angola, while a second subspecies is native to Africa's northern subtropics. The nominate subspecies is found in fynbos, succulent Karoo and Nama Karoo, while the northern subspecies is found in savannah, up to 1,500 m above sea level.

Species associations
The nominate subspecies is pollinated by the wasp Platyscapa desertorum Compton.. The wasp Comptoniella vannoorti Wiebes. is an associated non-pollinator that oviposits through the fig wall. The pollinator wasp of the northern subspecies, F. c. lecardii, is as yet unknown.

Similar species
F. salicifolia, the Wonderboom, is sometimes deemed a third subspecies of Ficus cordata, i.e. F. c. subsp. salicifolia (Vahl) C.C.Berg, but it lacks the yellowish sessile figs of F. cordata, and its range is much to the east.

References

Trees of Africa
Flora of Southern Africa
cordata